Royal Air Force Angle, or RAF Angle, is a former Royal Air Force station located on the Angle Peninsula Coast,  west of Pembroke, Pembrokeshire, Wales. It was operational from 1 December 1941 to the 1950s, having been used by both the Royal Air Force (RAF) and the Royal Navy.

History

It was initially used by No. 32 Squadron RAF flying the Hawker Hurricane I. In November 1941 they were replaced by 615 Squadron, and the Hurricane IIC. Several Squadrons followed: 312 (Czechoslovak) Squadron flew the Supermarine Spitfire VB and 263 Squadron with the Westland Whirlwind.

Next No. 152 Squadron RAF, No. 412 Squadron RCAF and No. 421 Squadron RCAF squadrons occupied the base, flying the Spitfire VB.

During May 1943 794 Naval Air Squadron were posted here conducting target towing and the control of the airfield was transferred to the Royal Navy with the site being renamed RNAS Angle (HMS Goldcrest). However, in September 1943 the Royal Navy moved from RNAS Angle to the RNAS Dale, and the RAF swapped sites in the other direction with the Coastal Command Development Unit moving in.

The airfield was used as the base for trials of the prototype Highball bouncing bomb on 6 October 1943 using a tunnel at Maenclochog as a target. Highball was a spherical design with dimples by Barnes Wallis and two were carried by de Havilland Mosquito aircraft, dropped either singly or in a salvoed pair.

Other units based at Angle were:
 No. 1 (Coastal) Engine Control Demonstration Unit (April 1944 – June 1944) became the Engine Control Instructional Flight (June 1944 – January 1945)
 Coastal Command Development Unit RAF (September 1943 – January 1945)

Between 1945 and the 1950s Angle was used as a Relief Landing Ground for Fleet Air Arm aircraft based at RNAS Brawdy.

Posted squadrons

Current use
The site has reverted to farming and only a few huts and the perimeter track are left.

See also
 List of former Royal Air Force stations
 Angle, Pembrokeshire

References

Citations

Bibliography

Royal Air Force stations in Wales
Royal Naval Air Stations in Wales